A transition metal imidazole complex is a coordination complex that has one or more imidazole ligands.  Complexes of imidazole itself are of little practical importance.  In contrast, imidazole derivatives, especially histidine, are pervasive ligands in biology where they bind metal cofactors.

Bonding and structure

Only the imine nitrogen (HC=N-CH) of imidazole is basic, and it is this nitrogen that binds to metal ions.  The pyrrole-like nitrogen ((HC-NH-CH) projects away from the metal. The pKa of protonated imidazolium cation is about 6.95, which indicates that the basicity of imidazole is intermediate between pyridine (pKa of pyridinium = 5.23) and ammonia (pKa = 9,24 of ammonium).  The donor properties of imidazole are also indicated by the redox properties of its complexes.

Imidazole is a pure sigma-donor ligand.  There is no evidence for pi backbonding in metal-imidazole complexes, a property that can be attributed to the presence of the pi-donor pyrrole-like NH center.  For this reason, imidazole can be classified as hard ligand.  Nonetheless, complexes between low-valent metals and imidazole are well known, e.g., [Re(imidazole)3(CO)3]+. 

Imidazole is a compact, flat ligand.  Six imidazole ligands fit comfortably around octahedral metal centers, e.g., [Fe(imidazole)6]2+.  The M-N(imidazole) bond is freely rotating. 

Homoleptic octahedral complexes have been characterized by X-ray crystallography for the following dications: Fe2+, Co2+, Ni2+, Zn2+, Cd2+.  Hexakis complexes of both Ru2+ and Ru3+ are also known.  Cu2+, Pd2+, and Pt2+ form homoleptic square planar complexes.  Zn2+, although crystallized as the hexakis complex, more typically forms a tetrahedral complex.

Complexes of substituted imidazoles

N-methylimidazole is slightly more basic than imidazole but is otherwise similar, if more lipophilic. Many salts of [M(imidazole-1-R)6]2+ are known (R = alkyl, vinyl, etc.).  2-Methylimidazoles are somewhat bulky ligands owing to the steric clash between the 2-methyl group and other ligands in octahedral complexes.

A modified benzimidazole ligand is found in all versions of vitamin B12.

Histidine
Histidine complexes comprise an important subset of transition metal amino acid complexes.   In common with other 3-substituted imidazoles, histidine can coordinate to metals via either of two nonequivalent tautomers.  The free amino acid can coordinate through the imidazole and either or both of the carboxylate and amine.

The imidazole side chain of histidine residues in proteins are common binding sites for metal ions. Unlike the free amino acid, the histidine residue (i.e., as a component of a peptide or protein), coordinates solely via the imidazole substituent. Examples include myoglobin (Fe), carbonic anhydrase (Zn), azurin (Cu), and alpha-ketoglutarate-dependent hydroxylases (Fe). Polyhistidine-tag ("hs tag") is an amino acid motif in proteins consisting of several histidine (His) residues that is attached to proteins to facilitate purification.  The concept relies on the affinity of the imidazole side chain for metal cations.

Reactions of imidazole ligands
Especially in cationic imidazole complexes, the N-H center is acidified.  For tricationic d6 pentammines, deprotonation of the imidazole ligand gives imidazolate complexes with pKa near 10 (M = Co, Rh, Ir):
[M(NH3)5(N2C3H4)]3+       [M(NH3)5(N2C3H3)]2+  +  H+
The d5 complex [Ru(NH3)5(N2C3H4)]3+ is more acidic, with a pKa of 8.9.  Thus, complexation to tricationic complexes acidify the pyrrolic NH center by at least 10,000.

Imidazole ligands are isomers of N-heterocyclic carbenes.  This conversion has been observed:
[Ru(NH3)5(N2C3H4)]2+   →   [Ru(NH3)5(C(NH)2(CH)2)]2+

Imidazolate complexes

The pKa of imidazole (to give imidazolate) is 14, thus it is easy to deprotonate.  Many metal complexes feature imidazolate as a bridging ligand.  One example of an imidazolate complex from biochemistry is found at the active site of copper-containing superoxide dismutase.

The M2(μ-imidazolate) motif underpins materials comprising zeolitic imidazolate frameworks ("ZIF"s).

References

Transition metal compounds